Kateryna Petrivna Kondratenko (born 12 July 1978), known professionally as Katya Chilly, is a Ukrainian singer and songwriter. Her style is a fusion of world and new-age music.

Biography 
Katya Chilly's debut album Rusalki in da House (Mermaids In Da House) was released in 1998. She started preparing material for the album in 1996 when she changed her stage name to Katya Chilly. She became popular in Ukraine after Chervona Ruta when she toured all over the country with its participants.

In 1999, Katya Chilly took part in the Scotland Edinburgh Festival Fringe. In March 2001, she performed at more than 40 concerts in the United Kingdom. A part of her performance was also broadcast by the British Broadcasting Corporation throughout the country.

In 2000, Katya started working on her second album Son (Dream). It was planned to be released in 2002 but the project was cancelled. However, this album has been informally distributed on the Internet.

Katya's single "Pivni" (Roosters), in collaboration with Ukrainian Records/Andrey Dakhovsky, was released in June 2005. It included the title track and remixes made by prominent Ukrainian DJs (DJ Lemon, DJ Tkach, DJ Professor Moriarti, and others).

Katya Chilly released her next album eight years after her first. On 10 March 2006 Ukrainian Records released the third album, Ya Molodaya (I Am Young).

In October 2007, Katya joined the DJuice music tour and visited seven Ukrainian cities.

MTV's Ukrainian website announced that the fourth album, Prosto Serdtse (Simply Heart), would be released in October 2007. However, in an interview for galainfo.com.ua, Katya stated that the release would be postponed until 2008. It remains unreleased.

In 2017, she participated in the seventh season of The Voice of Ukraine.

In 2020 she participated in the Ukrainian National Selection for Eurovision Song Contest 2020 with the song “Pich” but she did not qualify for the final.

Discography 
 1998 - Rusalki in da House
 2002 - Son
 2006 - Ya Molodaya
 2008 - Prosto Serdtse

References

External links 
 Official website
 Katya Chilly page at myspace
 Katya Chilly community at livejournal
 Katya Chilly interview with Ukraina Moloda 
 Katya Chilly - "U Zemli" (I Wannabe remix)

1978 births
Living people
Musicians from Kyiv
21st-century Ukrainian women singers
Ukrainian pop singers
Ukrainian folk singers
Ukrainian rock singers
The Voice of Ukraine contestants
Folktronica musicians